Albota is a commune in Argeș County, Muntenia, Romania. It is composed of five villages: Albota, Cerbu, Frătești, Gura Văii and Mareș.

The commune is traversed by the  road, which connects Pitești to  Slatina. The Teleorman River has its source in Gura Văii.

Natives
 Sanda Movilă
 Marin Radu

References

Communes in Argeș County
Localities in Muntenia